The women's 10,000 metres event featured at the 1987 World Championships in Rome, Italy. There were a total number of 37 participating athletes, with the final being held on 4 September 1987.

Medalists

Records
Existing records at the start of the event.

Final

Heats
Held on Monday 31 August 1987

See also
 1986 Women's European Championships 10,000 metres (Stuttgart)
 1988 Women's Olympic 10,000 metres (Seoul)
 1990 Women's European Championships 10,000 metres (Split)
 1991 Women's World Championships 10,000 metres (Tokyo)

References
 Results
 Results - World Athletics

 
10,000 metres at the World Athletics Championships
1987 in women's athletics